Jean-Baptiste Simon Sauvé de La Noue (20 October 1701 – 13 November 1760) was an 18th-century French actor and playwright.

Biography 
He studied at collège d'Harcourt in Paris. After he made his debut as a comedian in Lyon around 1721 and directed the company of Rouen for six years, he joined the troupe of the Comédie-Française in 1742 of which he became the 122nd sociétaire the same year. He retired in 1757.

He composed about ten comedies, including Mahomet second (1739) parodied the same year by Charles-Simon Favart under the title Moulinet premier, Zélisca (1746) and La Coquette corrigée (1756).

Bibliography

References

External links 
 Jean-Baptiste de La Noue on data.bnf.fr
 His plays on CÉSAR

18th-century French male actors
French male stage actors
Sociétaires of the Comédie-Française
18th-century French dramatists and playwrights
1701 births
People from Meaux
1760 deaths